Mark Andrews (May 19, 1926 – October 3, 2020) was an American politician from the state of North Dakota. He was a member of the Republican Party and served as a U.S. senator.

Life and career
Andrews was born in Cass County, North Dakota, where he attended public school. In 1944 at the age of 18, Andrews was admitted to the United States Military Academy. He quit in 1946 after receiving a disability discharge. He then attended North Dakota State University at Fargo, North Dakota, where he became a member of the Gamma Tau Chapter of the Sigma Chi fraternity, and graduated in 1949.

Andrews then became a farmer. He was a third-generation farmer on a Red River Valley plot that was started by his grandfather. During the 1950s he began to enter politics, serving on farmers' organizations and Republican committees. In 1962, Andrews ran for governor of North Dakota, losing to incumbent William L. Guy by 2,000 votes out of over 228,500 cast. The next year, he became the Republican candidate for a seat in the United States House of Representatives from North Dakota when a special election was required after the death of Congressman Hjalmar Nygaard. Andrews won the election. He was reelected to a full term in 1964 and served in the House until 1981, being reelected every two years. Andrews supported Nelson Rockefeller in the 1964 Republican presidential primaries. During his time in the House, Andrews voted in favor of the Civil Rights Act of 1964, the Civil Rights Act of 1968, and the Voting Rights Act of 1965.

In 1980, Andrews did not run for reelection to the House, but instead ran for the United States Senate seat being vacated by long-serving Republican Senator Milton Young, who was retiring. Andrews won the election with 70% of the vote and served in the Senate for one term, from 1981 to 1987. He was chairman of the select committee on Indian affairs from 1983 to 1987. As Senator and Representative, Andrews was socially moderate to liberal, opposing abortion bans and school prayer, and conservative on economic policies, but was also supportive of subsidies for farmers. Andrews was good friends with Massachusetts Senator Ted Kennedy and Minnesota Representative Bob Bergland.

In 1986, Andrews lost reelection to Democratic-NPL Tax Commissioner Kent Conrad by 2,120 votes in what was considered an upset, and subsequently retired from electoral politics. He started a consultancy firm in Washington, D.C. but lived in Mapleton, North Dakota. Grand Forks International Airport in Grand Forks, North Dakota has sometimes been called Mark Andrews International Airport, but usage of the name has declined.

Despite North Dakota's Republican bent at the presidential level, Andrews was the last Republican to represent the state in Congress until 2010, when Rick Berg was elected to the House and John Hoeven to the Senate.

Andrews married Mary in 1949. They had three children. He died on October 3, 2020, in Fargo, North Dakota. He was 94.

See also
1980 United States Senate election in North Dakota
1986 United States Senate election in North Dakota

Further reading
Richard F. Fenno, Jr.: When Incumbency fails : the Senate Career of Mark Andrews, Congressional Quarterly Press, 1992.

References

External links

 

1926 births
2020 deaths
20th-century American politicians
Farmers from North Dakota
Military personnel from North Dakota
North Dakota State University alumni
People from Cass County, North Dakota
Republican Party members of the United States House of Representatives from North Dakota
Republican Party United States senators from North Dakota
United States Military Academy alumni
University of North Dakota alumni
Members of Congress who became lobbyists